The Livraga derailment is the first and only railway accident to date that ever happened on the Italian high speed rail network. It took place on 6 February 2020 when a high-speed train derailed at Livraga, Lombardy, Italy. Two people died and 31 were injured.

Accident
Train 9595 was the first southbound service of any day in Italy's high speed railways, scheduled to start from Milan at 5:10 and to arrive in Salerno at 11:27. On 6 February 2020 the train, run by Frecciarossa 1000 trainset no. 21, entered the Milan-Bologna high-speed railway and reached its top speed as usual. Not long after departure it reached the "posto di movimento Livraga", a site equipped with passing loops where RFI maintenance vehicles are parked, named after the nearby town of Livraga.

For reasons under investigation, on that morning point number 5 (which connects the main line to the passing loop) was in diverted position without anyone knowing.

The coupling between coach 1 and 2 broke; the first coach spun round through 180 degrees, collided with some maintenance vehicles, and finally came to rest overturned near a railway building (one of whose walls was destroyed by the coach's bogie, which had detached). The remaining seven coaches, instead, remained upright and kept going straight with their wheels on the track ballast, until they stopped after a few hundred meters.

Of the 33 people on the train — 5 staff and 28 passengers — both drivers died, and all 31 survivors were injured.

The injured were taken to hospitals in Castel San Giovanni, Codogno, Crema, Cremona, Lodi, Melegnano, Piacenza, Pavia and to the Humanitas Research Hospital in Rozzano. Two people were seriously injured. Railway workers in Italy called a two-hour strike starting at midday, 7 February 2020.

Investigation
An investigation into the accident was opened. The Agenzia Nazionale per la Sicurezza delle Ferrovie is responsible for investigating railway accidents in Italy.

Point number five had been replaced the day before the accident.

Investigators reported that the accident was caused by a set of junction points being in the reverse position, but were reported to the signalling system as in the normal - i.e. straight - position. Maintenance works occurred that night, and as a consequence of the inspection, points were found faulty.

Unable to replace them overnight, maintenance workers followed a temporary override procedure, which is allowed to take place in these exceptional circumstances.

Maintenance workers claimed that they manually placed the faulty point to the straight position, but disconnected its network connection and its link to the safety signalling system (ETCS L2) because of their faulty status.

As normal part of such procedure, workers reported (according to evidence) that the point had been forcibly put in the straight position and taken offline. The signalling system used this information to report no anomalies on the line, and as a consequence the train was not commanded to reduce speed.

Under normal circumstances (i.e. if the junction was really straight), all services on the line could have continued their journeys at full speed. In this case, the first train on schedule hit the junction at 292km/h causing the derailment.

On February 13 the head of rail transport security agency ANSF stated that faulty cabling in switching equipment supplied by Alstom may have been a factor in the accident. All 11 points owned by RFI and produced within the same lot were put out of order.

References

2020 disasters in Italy
21st century in Lombardy
Derailments in Italy
February 2020 events in Italy
Province of Lodi
Railway accidents in 2020